Rough Town is a 1994 album recorded by French singer Johnny Hallyday. It is entirely written in English to win over the anglophone countries, with the title track written by Bryan Adams. It was released in September 1994 and achieved success in France, where it debuted at the top of the charts on 2 October 1994, but dropped just after and stayed for nine weeks on the top 50 chart. It provided two singles in France, "I Wanna Make Love To You" (#18) and "Love Affair" (#35), a duet with Kathy Mattea. The album was also released in Germany, but was unsuccessful in this country. The video for "Love Affair"  was directed by Dani Jacobs, filmed in Nashville and features Johnny and Kathy Mattea who duets on this track.

Track listing
 "Fool for the Blues" (Robin Le Mesurier, Paul Rafferty) — 4:34
 "(I Wanna) Make Love to You" 	(Jerry Lynn Williams) — 4:30
 "Love Affair" (Jerry Lynn Williams) — 5:12
 "Hurricane" (Steve Diamond) — 5:14
 "Can't Stop Wanting You" (Paul Brady) — 4:31
 "Are the Chances Gone" (Robin Le Mesurier, Sheppard Solomon) — 5:10
 "Rough Town" (Bryan Adams, Jim Vallance) — 4:26
 "Lightnin'" (Richard Guy Bailey, Simon Carman) — 5:06
 "Dry Spell" (Daryl Burgess, Colin James) — 7:56
 "You're Mine" (Kevin Dukes, Paul Rafferty) — 4:53
 "Before You Change Your Mind" (Daryl Burgess) — 4:07
 "It's a Long Way Home" (Will Jennings, Frankie Miller) — 4:08

Source : Allmusic.

Releases

Certifications and sales

Charts

References

1994 albums
Johnny Hallyday albums
Albums produced by Chris Kimsey